There are four basic theatrical forms either defined, implied, or derived by or from Aristotle: Tragedy; Comedy; Melodrama; and Drama.  Any number of styles can be used to convey these forms.

A good working definition of, "Style", is how something is done.  Theatrical styles are influenced by their time and place, artistic and other social structures, as well as the individual style of the particular artist or artists.  As theater is a mongrel art form, a production may or may not have stylistic integrity with regard to script, acting, direction, design, music, and venue.

Styles

There are a variety of theatrical styles used in theatre/drama. These include

Naturalism
Portraying life on stage with close attention to detail, based on observation of real life.  Cause and effect are central to the script's structure, with the subjects focused on conflicts of "nature vs. nurture", the natural order of things, survival, notions of evolution.  The production style is one of everyday reality.

Realism
Portraying characters on stage that are close to real life, with realistic settings and staging.  Realism is an effort to satisfy all the theatrical conventions necessary to the production, but to do so in a way that seems to be "normal" life.

Expressionism
Anti-realistic in seeing appearance as distorted and the truth lies within man. The outward appearance on stage can be distorted and unrealistic to portray an external truth or internal emotional conflict.

Absurdity and Surrealism
Presents a perspective that all human attempts at significance are illogical. Ultimate truth is chaos with little certainty. There is no necessity that needs to drive us.

Epic Theatre
As devised by Bertolt Brecht, epic theatre forces audience members to constantly return to rational observation, rather than emotional immersion. Sudden bursts of song, elements of absurdity and breaches of the fourth wall are all prime examples of how this rational observation is constantly revitalized; this idea is known as Verfremdungseffekt.

Melodrama
As devised by early Greek dramatists, these styles rely on stock characters and stereotypes to portray stories in an exaggerated way, either tragic or comic. Links to commedia dell'arte.

Theatre of Cruelty
As developed by Antonin Artaud, a style that encourages the shock and horror of the audience, through the excessive use of light and sound, instead of active entertainment or emotional relaxation.

Physical theatre
A modernist approach to theatre which centralises a performer's movement as the key communicator of a play's storytelling.

Poor theatre
Developed by Jerzy Growotski, this genre believes in the stripping back of set, props, costume, light and sound to allow the focus to be placed solely upon the actors, their characterisation and the underlying human relationships.

Immersive theatre
Developed by Augusto Boal, these styles all place focus on the audience member's individuality: their personal decisions, opinions and emotions, and how that impacts those of the characters onstage. The audience firmly exists within the 'world of the play'. Links to Promenade and Forum theatre.

Drama